Sclerophrys steindachneri is a species of toad in the family Bufonidae.
It is found in Cameroon, Central African Republic, Chad, Democratic Republic of the Congo, Ethiopia, Kenya, Nigeria, Somalia, Sudan, Tanzania, and Uganda.
Its natural habitats are subtropical or tropical moist lowland forests, moist savanna, subtropical or tropical moist shrubland, subtropical or tropical seasonally wet or flooded lowland grassland, swamps, freshwater marshes, intermittent freshwater marshes, plantations, rural gardens, urban areas, ponds, and canals and ditches.
It is threatened by habitat loss.

References

steindachneri
Amphibians described in 1893
Taxonomy articles created by Polbot